Pimelea alpina, the alpine rice-flower, is a species of flowering plant in the family Thymelaeaceae and is endemic to south-eastern continental Australia. It is an erect, prostrate or spreading shrub or undershrub with narrowly elliptic leaves crowded at the ends of branches and heads of pinkish red or white flowers.

Description

Taxonomy
Pimelea alpina was first formally described in 1857 by Carl Meissner in Prodromus Systematis Naturalis Regni Vegetabilis from an unpublished description by Ferdinand von Mueller of specimens he collected in the Cobberas Range.

Distribution and habitat

References

alpina
Flora of New South Wales
Flora of Victoria (Australia)
Malvales of Australia
Plants described in 1857
Taxa named by Carl Meissner